The 2002-03 Zurich Premiership was the 16th season of the top flight of the English domestic rugby union competitions.

The Zurich Championship which had been competed for in seasons 2000–01 and 2001–02 was dropped from this season.

Participating teams 

Notes

Table

Wasps won the 2002–03 Parker Pen Challenge Cup therefore automatically qualifying for the 2003–04 Heineken Cup. With Leicester Tigers winning the Zurich Wildcard Final, the final 2003–04 Heineken Cup berth was awarded to Leeds Tykes, placed fifth in the league.

Results

Week 1

Week 2

Week 3

Week 4

Week 5

Week 6

Week 7

Week 8

Week 9

Week 10

Week 11

Week 12

Week 13

Week 14

Week 15

Week 16

Week 17

Week 18

Week 19

Week 20

Week 21

Week 22

Week 23

Week 24

Play-offs

Semi final

Final

Zurich Wildcard 
Meanwhile, Leeds (5th place), Leicester (6th), Harlequins (7th), Saracens (8th) played for a Zurich Wildcard to the 2003–04 Heineken Cup:

Semi-finals

First leg

Second leg

Leicester advanced to the wildcard final due to a superior aggregate score of 51-39

Saracens advanced to the wildcard final due to a superior aggregate score of 70-48

Final

Leading scorers
Note: Flags to the left of player names indicate national team as has been defined under World Rugby eligibility rules, or primary nationality for players who have not earned international senior caps. Players may hold one or more non-WR nationalities.

Most points 
Source:

Most tries
Source:

Total Season Attendances

References

2002-03
 
England